Gérard Roussel (1500–50) was a French cleric, a student of Jacques Lefèvre d'Étaples and later a member, with his former teacher, of the Circle of Meaux around Guillaume Briçonnet, bishop of Meaux. This group was characterized by evangelical sensibilities, but all the while remaining Catholics, at a time when religious identities were unclear and a matter of dispute, due to the very recent Protestant Reformation. Gérard Roussel, along with Jacques Lefèvre d'Étaples, was studied by the historian Thierry Wanegffelen as being "between two pulpits", that of Rome and that of Geneva where Jean Calvin would settle permanently in 1541, and, more generally, between Catholicism and Protestantism.

When the Circle of Meaux was broken up in 1525, Roussel, like most of its members and unlike Guillaume Farel, stayed within the Catholic Church. He then became the personal preacher of Marguerite of Navarre, queen consort of Navarre ; under her patronage, he became bishop of the diocese of Oloron, within the kingdom of Navarre, in 1536. Jean Calvin addressed on this occasion a letter to Roussel, mostly condemnatory, in which he said :

Calling to mind the "former piety" of Roussel, "which I [Calvin] formerly admired, and which was for me an example of extreme worth", he called Roussel

Calvin ended his letter with a condemnation of Roussel's new position :

 Gérard Roussel did not cease to be bishop of Oloron ; however, he served as advisor to Marguerite of Navarre and then to her husband, king Henry II of Navarre. On his advice, measures quite similar to some aspects of the Protestant Reformation were introduced, such as preaching in vernacular rather than Latin, but without formally breaking away from Catholicism.

In much the same spirit, and to establish a reference for the priests of the kingdom of Navarre, he wrote the Familiar Exposition of the Creed, of the Law and of the Sunday Prayer (Familière exposition du symbole, de la loi et de l'oraison dominicale) in which he explained these fundamental texts in a light that could be seen as Protestant, especially close to the idea of justification by faith; it should however be noted that this trend of interpretation existed within Christianity before the Protestant Reformation, and was still held by some Catholic bishops and theologians. Furthermore, Farel did not attack, nor did he defend, the Catholic Church. However, such a stance was by now suspect at best, and in 1550 the Sorbonne, at that time Paris' university of theology and a major orthodoxy watchdog in the kingdom of France, condemned Roussel's work as "pernicious for Christiendom [...] reeking of heresy and in part obviously heretic".

Thus, condemned by representatives of both the catholic orthodoxy and the calvinist orthodoxy, Roussel indeed illustrated these men "between Rome and Geneva" studied by Thierry Wanegffelen. He died in the same year 1550.

He had a brother, Antoine Roussel.

References 

1500 births
1550 deaths
16th-century French Catholic theologians
Bishops of Oloron
French Renaissance humanists
16th-century French Roman Catholic bishops
French male non-fiction writers